Sanhe is a Hui ethnic township of Ergun City in northeastern Inner Mongolia, People's Republic of China, located about  north-northwest of downtown Ergun. It is the home of the Sanhe cattle and Sanhe horse.

Education 
There are two schools: Ergun City Sanhe Primary School (额尔古纳市三河小学) and Ergun City Sanhe Secondary School (额尔古纳市三河中学).

See also 
List of township-level divisions of Inner Mongolia

References 

Township-level divisions of Inner Mongolia
Ergun City
Ethnic townships of the People's Republic of China